James Patrick Considine (18 June 1902 – 13 April 1987) was an Australian rules footballer who played with Footscray in the Victorian Football League (VFL).

Notes

External links 

Australian rules footballers from Melbourne
Western Bulldogs players
1902 births
1987 deaths
People from Footscray, Victoria